David de Pury, Baron de Pury (19 January 1709 – 31 May 1786) was a banker, merchant, and philanthropist from the Principality of Neuchâtel, then a Prussian principality and now part of Switzerland. His involvement in Triangular trade, particularly diamond and precious wood trading between Europe and South America, earned him a vast fortune. He became a major benefactor for his home town, Neuchâtel, where he funded the construction of schools, hospitals, government buildings, and served as a patron of various local charities. De Pury has become a controversial figure in the 21st-century for his connection to the Atlantic slave trade through his business endeavors in Latin America.

Biography 

De Pury was born on 19 January 1709 in Neuchâtel, Kingdom of Prussia (in present-day Switzerland), one of eight children of the geographer and explorer Jean-Pierre Pury and Lucrèce Chaillet. His father, with the permission of English colonial governor Robert Johnson, founded the Colony of Purrysburg, a colony in the British Empire for Swiss Protestants, in present day South Carolina. De Pury's father died in Purrysburg, and was succeeded by his elder son Charles. Charles de Pury was killed during a slave revolt in the colony in 1754.

In 1725 de Pury left Switzerland and moved to Marseille, France, where he worked in maritime trade with the merchant Isaac Tarteiron for three years. In 1730 he was hired by the South Sea Company, trading imported goods from African and American ports. The South Sea Company was active in the Atlantic slave trade. His success as a businessman in the company led to him obtaining British citizenship.

In 1736 he moved to Lisbon, Portugal and co-founded, with Joseph Mellish, a bank called Pury, Mellish, & Devismes. From Portugal, de Pury established a business importing diamonds from Brazil, trading them in London's financial center. He also became involved in the trading of woods from the Amazon rainforest, including mahogany and jacaranda. In 1762 he was appointed a banker to Joseph I of Portugal.

He bequeathed a large part of his fortune to the city and the bourgeoisie of Neuchâtel, used to repair buildings and churches, fund the construction of the town hall, establish local charities, build a public library, and build schools and hospitals. The sum of the inheritance the city received was the modern equivalent of CHF 600  million.

In 1785 de Pury was ennobled to the rank of freiherr by Frederick II of Prussia. He died on 31 May 1786 in Lisbon. He is buried at the British Cemetery in Lisbon.

Legacy and controversy 
A portrait of de Pury, painted by Thomas Hickey, hangs in the charter room in the town hall in Neuchâtel. A bronze statue of de Pury, designed by David d'Angers, stands in the town square in Neuchâtel.

In June 2020 the Collectif Pour La Mémoire petitioned to have the statue in Neuchâtel removed since the majority of his wealth came from investments and holdings in industries that depended on forced labor of enslaved African people, inspired by the numerous monuments removed following the murder of George Floyd in the United States. The Collectif Pour La Mémoire stated in their petition, signed by over 2,000 people, that "the money inherited by David de Pury, at his death in 1786, was used to carry out a large number of works in the town of Neuchâtel but it was won by the blood of black people from Africa forced into slavery in the 18th century. It is our responsibility to challenge this legacy and refuse to allow anyone who has contributed to the suffering of more than 55,000 slaves to be seen as a benefactor." They also asked that a plaque commemorating those who suffered from racism and white supremacy replace the statue. By 13 July 2020 the petition had been signed by over 2,500 people.

The petition was criticized by Nicolas de Pury, a member of the de Pury family and elected representative of the Green Party to the General Council of Neuchâtel. He suggested that more historical research be done on his ancestor, and include his history with slavery on a plaque under the statue. De Pury also called for allocating funds to a historian to "shed light" on de Pury's entire life.

Late in the night on 12 July 2020 the statue of de Pury was vandalized by protesters. Red paint, symbolizing blood of enslaved Africans, was smeared across the statue. An email was sent to Arcinfo by the group responsible titled A Monument for Those Resisting Colonialism, Not for Slavers. The statue was cleaned the following morning.

References 

1709 births
1786 deaths
18th-century businesspeople
Barons of Germany
Burials at the British Cemetery, Lisbon
David
People from Neuchâtel
Prussian nobility
Nobility of Neuchâtel
South Sea Bubble
Bankers from the Principality of Neuchâtel
Expatriates in Portugal from the Principality of Neuchâtel
Merchants from the Principality of Neuchâtel
Philanthropists from the Principality of Neuchâtel
Protestants from the Principality of Neuchâtel
Swiss nobility